The Women's high jump event at the 2011 World Championships in Athletics was held at the Daegu Stadium on September 1 and 3.

Russia's Anna Chicherova entered the competition as the favourite with a world leading jump of 2.07 m. Although Blanka Vlašić had won world titles in 2007 and 2009 and was ranked second in the world, she was suffering from a leg injury and decided to compete after having initially withdrawn. Antonietta Di Martino had been the only other woman over 2.00 m that year. Emma Green, Venelina Veneva-Mateeva, 2004 Olympic champion Yelena Slesarenko and Ruth Beitia were the other established entrants, while Svetlana Shkolina was fourth in the world rankings. Chaunté Lowe, Ariane Friedrich and reigning Olympic champion Tia Hellebaut were notable absences.  It took 1.95 to make the final.

The medalists clearly separated from the field in order, each clearing 2.00 Chicherova on her first, Vlašić on her second and Di Martino on her third.  At 2.03 Chicherova remained clean while Vlašić again needed two attempts, with Di Martino unable to make the height.  At 2.05, neither was able to make it, though Vlašić looked closer.  After years of finishing one place behind Vlašić in major meets, it was the first time Chicherova was able to reverse those results.

Medalists

Records

Qualification standards

Schedule

Results

Qualification
Qualification: Qualifying Performance 1.95 (Q) or at least 12 best performers (q) advance to the final.

Final

References

External links
High jump results at IAAF website

High jump
High jump at the World Athletics Championships
2011 in women's athletics